The 2003–04 Hellenic Football League season was the 51st in the history of the Hellenic Football League, a football competition in England.

Premier Division

Premier Division featured 19 clubs which competed in the division last season, along with three new clubs:
Chipping Norton Town, promoted from Division One West
Hungerford Town, resigned from the Isthmian League
Slimbridge, promoted from Division One West

League table

Division One East

Division One East featured 14 clubs which competed in the division last season, along with three clubs:
Badshot Lea, joined from the Surrey Intermediate League
Chinnor, joined from the Oxfordshire Senior League
Wantage Town, relegated from the Premier Division

League table

Division One West

Division One West featured 17 clubs which competed in the division last season, along with one new club:
Quarry Nomads, transferred from Division One East

League table

References

External links
 Hellenic Football League

2003-04
8